Brad Emmerson (born December 16, 1985) is an American ice sledge hockey player and Paralympic gold medalist.  Competing at the 2010 Winter Paralympics, he won a gold medal in the men's ice sledge hockey tournament.

References

External links 
 

1985 births
Living people
American sledge hockey players
Paralympic sledge hockey players of the United States
Paralympic gold medalists for the United States
Ice sledge hockey players at the 2010 Winter Paralympics
Medalists at the 2010 Winter Paralympics
Paralympic medalists in sledge hockey
21st-century American people